Nicolas Roth (28 August 1990 in Würzburg) is a German footballer who played in the 3. Liga for SV Wehen Wiesbaden.

References

External links
 

1990 births
Living people
German footballers
SpVgg Greuther Fürth players
SV Wehen Wiesbaden players
SV Waldhof Mannheim players
3. Liga players
Association football midfielders
Sportspeople from Würzburg
Footballers from Bavaria